Manifestation is a compilation album by death metal band Malevolent Creation, released in 2000. A single and a double disc version of the album were released. The second disc of the double album is an enhanced CD with live video footage of the band's 1999 tour. The band had nothing to do with the release of the album

Track listing

CD 1

CD 2

References

Malevolent Creation compilation albums
2000 compilation albums
Albums with cover art by Travis Smith (artist)